Richard Martin Meredith  (27 March 1847 – 20 May 1934) was a co-founder and the first Chancellor of The University of Western Ontario; vice-chancellor of Ontario; President of the High Court of the Supreme Court of Ontario and Chief Justice of the Ontario Court of Common Pleas.

Family

Born at 565 Talbot Street, London, Canada West, he was one of the eight sons of John Walsingham Cooke Meredith, a first cousin of Chief Justice Sir William Collis Meredith, Edmund Allen Meredith and James Creed Meredith. He shared the same name as one of his great uncles (the father of James Creed Meredith), who was named for Richard Martin, a contemporary of Meredith's great grandfather, Ralph Meredith (1748–1799), Attorney Exchequer and Justice of the Peace for Co. Dublin. His brothers, known as The Eight London Merediths, included Chief Justice William Ralph Meredith, Vincent Meredith, Thomas Graves Meredith Q.C., and Charles Meredith, first cousins of Richard Edmund Meredith and Frederick Walsingham Meredith, President of the Law Society of Ireland.

Legal career

Educated at Hellmuth Boy's College, London, he then proceeded to the Royal Military College of Canada, passing out in 1865. He served as an officer at Windsor, Ontario during the Fenian raids, earning a medal. Following this he entered his brother William's legal offices and was called to the Bar in 1869. Specializing in chancery and equity law, he went into practice with another brother, Edmund Meredith (1845–1921) Q.C., a well-known criminal barrister, forming the London-based firm of Meredith & Meredith, subsequently Meredith, Judd & Meredith. He continued his career in London, during which time he took silk as a Queen's Counsel, until the Prime Minister, John A. Macdonald appointed him a Judge of the Chancery Division of the High Court of Ontario in 1890, at Toronto. In the same year (1890), he was also elected to the vice chancellorship of Ontario, a position he held until 1905. From 1905 to 1912, he was President of the High Court of the Supreme Court of Ontario. In 1905, he also served as a Judge at the Court of Appeal, where his frequent disagreements with his brothers William and Edmund earned him the nickname 'the dissenting judge'. In 1912, he succeeded his elder brother, William, as Chief Justice of the Court of Common Pleas, his final judicial post, retiring in 1930. He was sometime a director of the Ontario Investment Association.

University of Western Ontario

Meredith was instrumental in the founding of The University of Western Ontario, at his hometown of London. He served as the first Chancellor (1912–1916) of the university and was Chairman of the Board of Governors between 1908 and 1914. He established the R.M. Meredith Society, still in operation today, to help fund under-privileged students.

Personality

He retired from the Bench at the age of 83, and moved back from Toronto to the home where he was born, on Talbot Street, London, Ontario. "A noted athlete in his youth, he preserved in his erect bearing and brisk step, great physical vigour and athletic energy, even after he had reached an advanced age." Like many of his brothers he had a great love of flowers and floriculture, and was at his happiest whiling away the hours in his extensive gardens on the Meredith's London estate. His obituary read,

Chief Justice Meredith had a certain self-assurance and impatience with intellects less able than his own that sometimes brought him into sharp conflict with judicial colleagues, but he had a profound knowledge of law, and his ability and fairness earned him the respect of the Ontario Bar... (Out of court) his disposition was very kindly and friendly, and he was at all times a gentleman. In court he required the most rigorous etiquette, but his strict fairness and careful attention to details made him respected by all members of the Bar.

In his earlier days he was a well-known figure in Toronto society, but on returning to London he lived in almost complete retirement. In 1901, he presented a chime of ten bells, cast in England, and the clock on the clocktower to St. Paul's Cathedral (London, Ontario) in memory of his parents. He was the best man at the wedding of his brother, Sir Vincent Meredith in 1888. He was unmarried, and died at the home his father had built in the early 1840s, and where he was born. He is buried at the Meredith plot in Woodland Cemetery, London. He left an estate of $235,598, having given much away to charitable causes during his lifetime. His portrait, and that of his brother Sir William Ralph Meredith, hangs in Osgoode Hall, Toronto.

Arms

External links
 R.M. Meredith, Western Libraries
 Meredith's letter for the foundation of the University of Western Ontario

See also
Meredith Resigns as Chief Justice - Montreal Gazette, 30 September 1930
 Sir William Meredith May Be New Lieutenant-Governor - Rumors at Ottawa that R.M. Meredith will Succeed to Chief-Justiceship
 Member of Family of Noted Brothers Dies - R.M. Meredith - Ottawa Citizen, 21 May 1934
 The Meredith Family

References

Canadian King's Counsel
Judges in Ontario
People from London, Ontario
1934 deaths
University of Western Ontario
Royal Military College of Canada alumni
1847 births